Kiamichi may refer to:

 Kiamichi (horse)
 Kiamichi, Oklahoma

Other 
 Kiamichi Mountains
 Kiamichi River
 Kiamichi Railroad
 Kiamichi Shale
 Kiamichi shiner